Alvin Saunders (July 12, 1817November 1, 1899) was a U.S. Senator from Nebraska, as well as the final and longest-serving governor of the Nebraska Territory, a tenure he served during most of the American Civil War.

Education
Saunders was born in Fleming County, Kentucky. He attended the common schools and pursued an academic course; he moved with his father to Illinois in 1829 and then to Mount Pleasant, Iowa (then a part of Wisconsin Territory) in 1836.

Political career
He was the postmaster of Mount Pleasant for seven years. Saunders studied law but never entered into practice; instead, he engaged in mercantile pursuits and banking. He was a delegate to the Iowa State constitutional convention in 1846 and was a member of the Iowa State Senate from 1854 to 1856 and 1858 to 1860. Saunders was one of the commissioners appointed by Congress to organize the Union Pacific Railroad Company.

He served as the last Governor of Nebraska Territory from 1861 to 1867. He was a delegate to the 1868 Republican National Convention. Saunders was elected as a Republican to the United States Senate and served a single term from March 4, 1877, to March 3, 1883; chairman of the Committee on Territories (Forty-seventh Congress). He died in Omaha on November 1, 1899; interment in Forest Lawn Cemetery.

Family

Saunders' father, Gunnel, was said to be of "old stock" in Culpepper County, Virginia. His mother was Mary Mauzy of the same county. They moved to Kentucky and later to Illinois, where Alvin attended school and did farm work until 1836, when the young man removed to Mount Pleasant, Iowa, which was then part of Wisconsin.

At his death he left a wife and two children, Charles B., and a daughter, Mary  (later Mrs. Russell Harrison of Washington, D.C.)

Saunders was the grandfather of William Henry Harrison III, who served several terms as Wyoming's member of the U.S. House of Representatives in the 1950s and 60s. His son-in-law was Russell Benjamin Harrison.

Legacy
Saunders County, Nebraska and Saunders School in Omaha were both named after him. Alvin Saunders Johnson, the founding editor of The New Republic, was named in honor of Saunders.

References

 
 

1817 births
1899 deaths
People from Fleming County, Kentucky
Iowa state senators
Governors of Nebraska Territory
People of Nebraska in the American Civil War
Union (American Civil War) political leaders
People from Mount Pleasant, Iowa
Iowa postmasters
Union Pacific Railroad people
People of Iowa in the American Civil War
Republican Party United States senators from Nebraska
Nebraska Republicans